The 0 prefix for area codes is used when dialing locally within Yemen, e.g. 01-xxx-xxx  and is omitted when calling from outside Yemen, e.g. +967-1-xxx-xxx.

The telephone numbering plan in Yemen is as follows:

 01 Sana'a
 02 Aden
 03 Hodaidah
 04 Ibb, Taiz
 05 Hadramaut
 06 Marib
 07 Saddah
 10 Landline (Yemen4G)
 70 Cell phones (Y)
 71 Cell phones (Sabafon)
 73 Cell phones (Yemeni Omani United (YOU), formerly MTN and Spacetel)
 77 and 78 Cell phones (Yemen Mobile)
 79 Cell phones (TeleYemen)(Discontinued)

References

ITU allocation data
دليل الهاتف اليمني

Yemen
Telecommunications in Yemen
Telephone numbers